Sabol (Slovak feminine: Sabolová) is a surname. Notable people with the surname include:

Ed Sabol (1916–2015), American filmmaker
Joseph G. Sabol (1936–1998), American football player
Juraj Sabol (born 1983), Slovak footballer
Sebastian Sabol (1909–2003), Ukrainian priest
Shaun Sabol (born 1966), American ice hockey player
Steve Sabol (1942–2012), American filmmaker
Veronika Sabolová (born 1980), Slovak luger

See also
 
 Sobal
 Sobol (surname)